DeAnna Marie Price (born June 8, 1993) is an American track and field athlete competing primarily in the hammer throw. 
The throw ranked her as the #2 women's thrower in history. 

In February 2021, Price broke the women’s world record in the indoor hammer-style 25-pound weight throw. Price, the former Southern Illinois University athlete, threw the weight 85-4¼, breaking the previous record of 83-11½ set by Gwen Berry in 2017.

Career
Price represented the USA at the 2015 World Championships in Beijing without qualifying for the final. A month before the World Championships, Price had finished fourth at the 2015 Pan American Games.  Then, two weeks later, Price picked up her first international medal by taking a silver behind Amber Campbell at the 2015 NACAC Championships.

Price placed third in hammer behind Team USA teammates Amber Campbell and Gwen Berry at the 2016 United States Olympic Trials Price represented the United States at 2016 Summer Olympics, finishing eighth.

While throwing for Southern Illinois University, she won back to back NCAA titles in the hammer throw.  Price has endured a series of injuries and only has one kidney.

Price attended Troy Buchanan High School in Troy, Missouri. There she was an All-State softball player and finished second in the discus and fifth in the shot put at the state track meet. Price had college scholarship offers in both softball and track and field.

Competition record

Personal bests
Outdoor
Shot put – 16.30 m (Mt. SAC Relays 2015)
Hammer throw – 80.31 m (Olympic Trials, 2021)
Discus – 53.46 m (MVC Outdoors 2015)
Indoor
Shot put – 16.29 m (Carbondale 2014)
Weight throw – 26.02 m (Albuquerque, 2023, World Record)

References

External links
 

1993 births
Living people
American female hammer throwers
Athletes (track and field) at the 2015 Pan American Games
Athletes (track and field) at the 2016 Summer Olympics
Female weight throwers
Olympic track and field athletes of the United States
People from St. Charles, Missouri
Southern Illinois Salukis women's track and field athletes
Sportspeople from Greater St. Louis
Track and field athletes from Missouri
World Athletics Championships winners
World Athletics Championships athletes for the United States
World Athletics Championships medalists
IAAF Continental Cup winners
USA Outdoor Track and Field Championships winners
USA Indoor Track and Field Championships winners
Pan American Games track and field athletes for the United States
Athletes (track and field) at the 2020 Summer Olympics